Erison Da Silva Santos Carnietto , known as Baiano, (born January 19, 1981) is a Brazilian former footballer who played as a midfielder. He is a defensive midfielder and right defender.

Baiano previously played for Slavia Sofia in Bulgaria.

Career
In 2000 as a professional player has disputed the Championship Paulista by São Bento and on the following year after a brief return to Portuguesa Londrinense Baiano was transferred to Mexico to Guerreros Acapulco with mild stroke in Cruz Azul.

In the period 2005 to 2006 he returned to play in Brazilian fields Portuguesa Londrinense. In 2007 Baiano back outside to play with FC Ararat first division team in Armenia (Asia). On the next year was his first experience in European football he debut in U Cluj.

In season 2008–09, Baiano disputed the second Romanian league with the FC Bihor team and in the second half of 2009 he returned to Universitatea Cluj, time witch disputed the second division Romanian in 2009/2010 season and now returns to the first division to play in 2010–11 season.

In July 2010, Baiano signed a contract with CS Pandurii Târgu Jiu, but after a few months he was sold to Liga II club Politehnica Iasi in September 2010.

In January 2011, after playing three years in Romania, Baiano signed with Bulgarian A PFG club Slavia Sofia. In 2012, he joined the Malaysian club, Terengganu FA for the 2012 Malaysia Super League season.

References

External links
 
 
 Player profile on Soccer Repository
 Slavia Sofia Official Website

1981 births
Living people
Brazilian footballers
Brazilian expatriate footballers
Associação Portuguesa Londrinense players
FC Universitatea Cluj players
FC Bihor Oradea players
First Professional Football League (Bulgaria) players
PFC Slavia Sofia players
Terengganu FC players
Liga I players
Liga II players
CS Pandurii Târgu Jiu players
FC Politehnica Iași (2010) players
Expatriate footballers in Mexico
Brazilian expatriate sportspeople in Mexico
Expatriate footballers in Romania
Brazilian expatriate sportspeople in Romania
Expatriate footballers in Bulgaria
Brazilian expatriate sportspeople in Bulgaria
Sportspeople from Bahia
Association football midfielders